Whites Creek is an Ozark stream in Douglas County, Missouri. It is a tributary of Hunter Creek.

The headwaters are at an elevation of about 1250 feet and the mouth is at an elevation of 863 feet.

Whites Creek begins as a south flowing stream on the south side of Table Rock Knob just southeast of Ava and flows south for a short distance before turning east. The stream runs parallel to Missouri Route 14 and is bridged where the road turns south.

Whites Creek has the name of a pioneer citizen with the surname White.

See also
List of rivers of Missouri

References

Rivers of Douglas County, Missouri
Rivers of Missouri